Said One To The Other is the debut EP release by artist Lisa Mitchell. The EP was released in Australia in late August 2007.

The songs, "Slow" and "Alice in Wonderland", have also been called "Sailing Softly" and "Alice" respectively. The songs feature vocals, guitar and additional instruments. "Incomplete Lullaby" was written for piano and vocals in contrast to her signature acoustic songs, with guitar-only accompaniment.

Track listing
"Slow" – 4:06
"Incomplete Lullaby"  – 3:45
"Sometimes I Feel Like Alice" – 3:59
"All I Know" – 3:31

All songs written by Mitchell excluding "Incomplete Lullaby" (written by Mitchell and Dann Hume, of Evermore fame). Vocals and guitar are all by Mitchell, and piano & percussion by Dann Hume.

Charts
The EP made its debut in the ARIA Singles Chart at number twenty-seven on 20 August 2007.

External links
 Lisa Mitchell's official site

2007 debut EPs
Lisa Mitchell albums